Jim Balharry (13 May 1868 – 2 September 1958) was an Australian rules footballer who played with Carlton in the VFA and Victorian Football League (VFL).

Notes

External links 

Jim Balharry's profile at Blueseum

1868 births
1958 deaths
Australian rules footballers from Melbourne
Carlton Football Club (VFA) players
Carlton Football Club players
People from Williamstown, Victoria